Sebastian Eckner (born 3 June 1991) is a German motorcycle racer.

Career statistics

Grand Prix motorcycle racing

By season

Races by year

References

1991 births
Living people
German motorcycle racers
125cc World Championship riders
Sportspeople from Dresden